"Gekreuzigt" (German for Crucified) is the first single from the album Unrein by Oomph!. The single has also been released in a special form of a metal-box. The song has been re-recorded for the Oomph! compilation Delikatessen.

Standard track listing
 Gekreuzigt (Single Version)
 Gekreuzigt (Naghavi Mix)
 Gekreuzigt (Jelly & Fish Edit Mix)
 Gekreuzigt (Haujobb Mix)

Limited track listing
 Gekreuzigt (Single Version)
 Gekreuzigt (Naghavi Mix)
 Gekreuzigt (Jelly & Fish Extended Mix)
 Gekreuzigt (Haujobb Mix)
 Gekreuzigt (Myer Mix)

Charts

References

Oomph! songs
1998 singles
1998 songs
Songs written by Dero Goi